Mordellistena austriaca is a species of beetle in the genus Mordellistena of the family Mordellidae. It was described in 1898 and can be found in Albania, Austria, Bosnia and Herzegovina, Croatia, Czech Republic, France, Germany, Greece, Hungary, Italy, Poland, Romania, Slovakia, and Switzerland.

References

austriaca
Beetles described in 1898
Beetles of Europe